Araespor is a genus of Australasian longhorn beetles in the tribe Callidiopini, erected by Thomson in 1878.

Species
BioLib lists:
 Araespor callosus Gressitt, 1959
 Araespor darlingtoni Gressitt, 1959
 Araespor gazellus Gressitt, 1959
 Araespor longicollis Thomson, 1878
 Araespor pallidus Gressitt, 1959
 Araespor pictus (Fauvel, 1906)
 Araespor quinquepustulatus (Montrouzier, 1861)

References

External links
 

Callidiopini
Cerambycidae genera